Hassan Zirek 29 November 1921 – 29 July 1972) was a celebrated Iranian Kurdish songwriter-singer from Bukan, known for his recordings of classical Kurdish folk songs. He was famous for his classical and sensual lyrics, and it is believed that he composed over thousand songs in his lifetime.

References

1921 births
1972 deaths
Iranian Kurdish people
Kurdish musicians
Kurdish-language singers
People from Bukan
20th-century Iranian male singers
Deaths from cancer in Iran